Mythworld is a role-playing game published by Hippogriff Publications in 1986.

Description
Mythworld is a fantasy role-playing system with rules describing the real medieval world with some magic. The boxed set includes the Rules, Bestiary, Outfitter, Skills, Spells, and Robber's Cave books, each of which was also sold separately.

Publication history
Mythworld was designed by Paul Cardwell, Jr., and published by Hippogriff Publications in 1986 as a boxed set containing a 112-page book, a 96-page book, a 68-page book, a 52-page book, a 28-page book, and a 12-page book, five character sheets, and dice.

References

Fantasy role-playing games
Role-playing games introduced in 1986